Dips is a Swedish comedy series by Jesper Rönndahl and Marie Agerhäll. It was produced by APAB for SVT. All episodes of the first season were published on SVT Play on 24 December 2018.

The series is about the "dips" in-training Jens Stråhle (Jesper Rönndahl) and Fanny Båtsman (Moa Lundqvist), who are interns at the Protocol Division at the Ministry for Foreign Affairs, and their mentor Mimmi Hamillton (Marie Agerhäll). Frequently appearing is also the administration director-general Hendrik Tür (Kristian Luuk).

According to the creators Jesper Rönndahl and Marie Agerhäll, much in the series is based on reality and material they have got when they have both "gone undercover and interviewed people on both the floor and at the top secretly". The material is however altered as the series is not a documentary.

In late October 2019 Jesper Rönndahl announced that a season two was on its way.

Cast and characters 

 Jens Stråhle (Jesper Rönndahl) is the son of a prominent Swedish diplomat. He spent much of his early life abroad and has thus been spoiled by the extended diplomatic immunity from his father. While being socially competent and a skilled speaker, he lacks knowledge about the larger subjects such a women's right and social equality.
 Fanny Båtsman (Moa Lundqvist) is very knowledgeable about foreign affairs and current events. However, this is not always clear as she is both pushy and dogmatic. She shares last name with the fictional dog Båtsman, but her family carried the name first.
 Mimmi Hamillton (Marie Agerhäll) has made a "horizontal career" at the ministry and is responsible for Jens and Fanny. She is well-versed in the inner workings of the ministry but lacks the necessary organizational skills to do her job.
 Hendrik Tür (Kristian Luuk) is the administration director-general of the ministry and is Jens, Fanny, and Mimmi's superior. He is also the godson to Jens' father.

Episodes

Reviews and rewards 
A review by Hanna Persson at Nöjesguiden commented that "after some [previous] questionable purchases by SVT" , Dips is "smart-fun with political awareness and stupid-fun with misspelled SMS – at the same time". She described the serie as being about "really annoying people who also happen to be totally incompetent but at the same time work at the Ministry of Foreign Affairs." 

In 2019 Dips was SVT's nomination for Kristallen category Humor program of the year, but lost to TV4 AB's Enkelstöten. In September 2019 it won The Swedish Humor Prize's Comedy of the Year award during the Childhood Cancer Gala.

References 

2018 Swedish television series debuts
2010s Swedish television series
Television shows set in Stockholm
Swedish-language television shows
Swedish comedy television series
Swedish satirical television shows